Magne Charge (also known as Magne-Charge, MagneCharge and J1773) is a largely obsolete inductive charging system used to charge battery electric vehicles (BEVs). It was produced by General Motors subsidiary Delco Electronics for vehicles such as the EV1, the Chevy S10 EV, and the Toyota RAV4 EV. It is still used by a few hundred first generation Toyota RAV4 EV electric vehicles. As these first generation Toyota RAV4 EV electric vehicles retire from the roadways, Magne Charge will be completely obsolete since no existing or future electric vehicles will use it. The 2012 Gen 2 RAV4 EV, as well as the Nissan Leaf and Chevrolet Volt, use the wired SAE J1772 charging standard instead of Magne Charge.

Upgrades
The Level 2 charger with 6.6 kW was the most common version. A Level 3 higher power 50 kW fast charge version was demonstrated. This charger was unique in that its charge port used an inductive charge paddle, of which there were two sizes, a small and large paddle. These are often referred on electric vehicle charging station maps as SPI and LPI stations for Small Paddle Inductive and Large Paddle Inductive stations. The system was also designed to be safe even when used in the rain and was demonstrated in operation fully submerged in water.

Magne Charge support was withdrawn by General Motors in 2002, after the California Air Resources Board settled on a conductive charging interface for electric vehicles in California in June 2001. In 2011 the California Energy Commission created the Reconnect CA Program, a grant program to upgrade and expand existing publicly available EV charging infrastructure to the SAE J1772 charging standard.

See also
 ChargeBox
 Charging station

References

External links

Charging stations
Battery electric vehicles